Giorgos Ch. Theocharis (Greek: Γιώργος Χ. Θεοχάρης) is a Greek novelist, poet and writer.

Biography
He is born 1951 in Desfina in Phocis, and since 1965 has lived in Aspra Spitia. For many years he worked in the 
Aluminium of Greece factory.

He is a member of the Greek Society of Authors, and in 1988 became director of the literary magazine Emvolimon.  He is of the editors of Book Press.

He speaks French.

Bibliography
His poems, essays and literary reviews published in Greece and in other countries. His poems were translated into French, English and Latin American.
 Poor Mineral (Πτωχόν Μετάλευμα), Ed. Emvolimon, 1990,
 Rotation (Αμειψισπορά), Ed. Levadeia Central Public Library, 1996,
 Enthymion (Ενθύμιον), Ed. Kastaniotis, 2004
 In memory (Από μνήμης), Ed. Melani, Athens 2010.
 Distomo: 10th of June 1944 – The Holocaust, Ed. Bookstore "Sygxroni Ekfrasi", 2010. In Greek State Literature Prizes for 2011, the Travel Literature Prize was granted to Giorgos Ch. Theocharis for his work.

See also
List of Greek writers

References
''The version of the article is translated and is based from the article at the Greek Wikipedia (el:Main Page)

1951 births
Living people
People from Phocis
Greek novelists
Modern Greek poets
20th-century Greek poets
Date of birth missing (living people)